Andreas Heimer (born 10 December 1997) is a Danish footballer.

Career

B93
Heimer started playing football at Frederiksberg Boldklub, better known as FB, before joining KB for a short period and later B93 at the age of 14. Heimer got his first team debut for B93 on 6 June 2015 at the age of 17 years, 5 months and 27 days, making him one of the youngest debutants in the club's history. After over 70 first team games for B93, Heimer left the club to join Thisted FC in January 2018.

Silkeborg IF
After a year at Danish 1st Division club Thisted FC, Silkeborg IF announced on 30 January 2019, that Heimer had joined the club on a contract for the rest of the season.

Næstved BK
After leaving Silkeborg IF in December 2019, Heimer signed with Næstved BK on 22 January 2020 on a free agent. Heimer confirmed on 26 July 2020, that his contract with Næstved had been terminated.

References

Living people
1997 births
Association football midfielders
Danish men's footballers
Boldklubben af 1893 players
Thisted FC players
Silkeborg IF players
Næstved Boldklub players
Danish Superliga players
Danish 1st Division players
Danish 2nd Division players
Footballers from Copenhagen